Pristimantis incertus is a species of frogs in the family Strabomantidae. It is endemic to northern Venezuela where it is only known from its (presumed) type locality near La Guaira. 
Its natural habitats are tropical moist lowland forests and moist montane forests.

References

incertus
Endemic fauna of Venezuela
Amphibians of Venezuela
Frogs of South America
Amphibians described in 1927
Taxonomy articles created by Polbot